Nobody's Coming to Save You is the second studio album by British indie band The Sunshine Underground, the follow-up to their 2006 album, Raise the Alarm, and was released on 16 February 2010 through City Rockers/EMI. The album was recorded in September 2009 in Castleford.

Track listing
"Coming to Save You" – 4:28
"Spell It Out" - 3:52
"We've Always Been Your Friends" - 4:13
"In Your Arms" - 3:50
"A Warning Sign" - 5:00
"Change Your Mind" - 4:40
"Any Minute Now" - 3:36
"Here It Comes" - 4:42
"One by One" - 3:55
"The Messiah" - 5:27

2010 albums
The Sunshine Underground albums